Bernard Mitton and Butch Walts were the defending champions but only Walts competed that year with Gary Donnelly.

Donnelly and Walts lost in the second round to Jan Gunnarsson and Michael Mortensen.

Heinz Günthardt and Balázs Taróczy won in the final 3–6, 7–6, 6–3 against Ken Flach and Robert Seguso.

Seeds
The top four seeded teams received byes into the second round.

Draw

Finals

Top half

Bottom half

References
 1985 Pilot Pen Classic Doubles Draw

Pilot Pen Classic Doubles